Lucien Maelfait (30 July 1919 – 5 November 2009) was a French racing cyclist. He rode in the 1949 Tour de France.

References

External links

1919 births
2009 deaths
French male cyclists
Cyclists from Hainaut (province)